Association Football Club Uckfield was a football club based in Uckfield, East Sussex, England.

History
The club was formed in 1988 as Wealden Football Club. They joined the Sussex County League Division Three in 1998 and finished runners-up in 1999–2000, gaining promotion to Division Two. The club entered the FA Vase for the first time in 2006–07 and reached the first round. In 2010, they were renamed A.F.C. Uckfield and went on to win Division Two in 2010–11, earning promotion to Division One.

In July 2014, they merged with Uckfield Town to form A.F.C. Uckfield Town; the new club adopted Uckfield Town's black and red colours for their home kit and A.F.C. Uckfield's sky blue and navy blue as the away kit, and played at the Oaks.

Honours
Sussex County League
Division Two champions 2010–11

Records
Best FA Cup performance: Extra preliminary round, 2007–08, 2008–09, 2009–10, 2010–11, 2011–12, 2012–13
Best FA Vase performance: First round, 2006–07

References

Wealden District
Southern Combination Football League
Defunct football clubs in East Sussex
Defunct football clubs in England
Association football clubs established in 1988
1988 establishments in England
Association football clubs disestablished in 2014
2014 disestablishments in England